La Inmaculada is a 1939 American Spanish-language drama film. Directed by Louis Gasnier, the film stars Fortunio Bonanova, Andrea Palma, and Milissa Sierra. It was released on September 19, 1939.

Cast list
 Fortunio Bonanova as René
 Andrea Palma as Consuelo
 Milissa Sierra as Concha
 Tana as María Luisa
 Luis Díaz Flores as Luis Angel
 Daniel F. Rea as Homobono
 Julia Montoya as Severina
 Felipe Turich as Nacho
 Raquel Turich as Doña Rosa
 Carlos Villarías as Dr. Torres

References

External links
 
 

1939 drama films
1939 films
American drama films
American black-and-white films
Films directed by Louis J. Gasnier
1930s American films
1930s English-language films